Volvulella is a genus of gastropods belonging to the family Rhizoridae.

The genus has almost cosmopolitan distribution.

Species:

Volvulella acuminata 
Volvulella angustata 
Volvulella attenuata 
Volvulella californica 
Volvulella cannada 
Volvulella catharia 
Volvulella compacta 
Volvulella cylichnoides 
Volvulella cylindrella 
Volvulella cylindrica 
Volvulella cylindrica 
Volvulella eburnea 
Volvulella exilis 
Volvulella flavotincta 
Volvulella fortis 
Volvulella fulmeniculum 
Volvulella gluma 
Volvulella ischnatracta 
Volvulella joaquinensis 
Volvulella kinokuniana 
Volvulella lenis 
Volvulella marwicki 
Volvulella mecyntea 
Volvulella micratracta 
Volvulella minuta 
Volvulella multistriata 
Volvulella mutabilis 
Volvulella nesentus 
Volvulella onoae 
Volvulella opalina 
Volvulella ovulina 
Volvulella panamica 
Volvulella paupercula 
Volvulella persimilis 
Volvulella pia 
Volvulella radiola 
Volvulella reflexa 
Volvulella rostrata 
Volvulella sculpturata 
Volvulella spectabilis 
Volvulella striatula 
Volvulella suavis 
Volvulella sulcata 
Volvulella texasiana 
Volvulella tokunagai 
Volvulella tragula 
Volvulella tritica 
Volvulella truncata

References

Gastropods